John "Jack" Booth (birth unknown) is an English former professional rugby league footballer who played in the 1940s and 1950s.

Playing career

International honours
Jack Booth played right-, i.e. number 10, and scored a try, in Great Britain's 20-23 defeat by Australasia (comprising British-based Australians and New Zealanders) in the Festival of Britain match at Headingley Rugby Stadium, Leeds on Saturday 19 May 1951.

County Honours
Jack Booth was selected for Yorkshire County XIII whilst at Wakefield Trinity during the 1947/48, 1950/51 and 1951/52 seasons.

County Cup Final appearances
Jack Booth played right-, i.e. number 12, in Wakefield Trinity’s 7-7 draw with Leeds in the 1947 Yorkshire County Cup Final during the 1947–48 season at Fartown Ground, Huddersfield on Saturday 1 November 1947, played right- in the 8-7 victory over Leeds in the 1947 Yorkshire County Cup Final replay during the 1947–48 season at Odsal Stadium, Bradford on Wednesday 5 November 1947, and played  left-, i.e. number 8, in the 17-3 victory over Keighley in the 1951 Yorkshire County Cup Final during the 1951–52 season at Fartown Ground, Huddersfield on Saturday 27 October 1951.

Club career
Jack Booth made his début for Wakefield Trinity during November 1946, he appears to have scored no drop-goals (or field-goals as they are currently known in Australasia), but prior to the 1974–75 season all goals, whether; conversions, penalties, or drop-goals, scored 2-points, consequently prior to this date drop-goals were often not explicitly documented, therefore '0' drop-goals may indicate drop-goals not recorded, rather than no drop-goals scored. In addition, prior to the 1949–50 season, the archaic field-goal was also still a valid means of scoring points.

Testimonial match
Jack Booth's Testimonial match at Wakefield Trinity took place against a Lionel Cooper Select XIII on Wednesday 28 April 1954.

References

External links
Search for "Booth" at rugbyleagueproject.org
Trinity double winners
Search for "John Booth" at britishnewspaperarchive.co.uk
Search for "Jack Booth" at britishnewspaperarchive.co.uk

English rugby league players
Living people
Place of birth missing (living people)
Rugby league props
Rugby league second-rows
Wakefield Trinity players
Year of birth missing (living people)
Yorkshire rugby league team players